Lathyarcha is a genus of Australian intertidal spiders that was first described by Eugène Simon in 1908.  it contains only three species: L. cinctipes, L. inornata, and L. tetrica. Originally placed with the intertidal spiders, it was moved to the Matachiinae (subfamily of Amaurobiidae) in 1967.

References

Araneomorphae genera
Desidae
Spiders of Australia
Taxa named by Eugène Simon